The Tatra 13 is a vintage truck made by Czech manufacturer Tatra. It was manufactured between 1924 and 1933.

The truck was derived from model Tatra 11, with which it shared components and differed from it by strengthened rear axle. Initially the front wheels didn't have brakes. As Tatra 11 was succeeded by Tatra 12 (1926), the truck underwent modernization, which among other things brought it brakes to all four wheels.

Design

Engine
The Tatra 13 initially used the engine from the Tatra 11, and later (since 1926) was manufactured with the Tatra 12 engine.

The gearbox had four speeds (+reverse).

Chassis
The initial chassis was derived from Tatra 11, while later from Tatra 12.

The front axle is stiff, suspended by transverse half-elliptic spring, carried by the aluminium engine block, while the rear axle consists of two independent swinging half-axles, suspended by a transverse half-elliptic spring, which is mounted on top of the differential box and leaning its ends against the brake plates. The advantage of this solution is excellent progressiveness of the suspension.

Versions
The vehicle weighed about 1000 kg while it had payload of 800–1200 kg depending on version.

Tatra 13 was offered foremost as a small truck, however also buses were derived from it. It differs from Tatra 11 and 12 not only by the carrossery, but also by use of larger wheels at the rear.

References
 Tatra portal - Web site about TATRA cars and trucks - Tatra 13

Cars of the Czech Republic
13
Rear-wheel-drive vehicles
1920s cars
1930s cars
Vehicles introduced in 1924